Ianca is a town in Brăila County, Muntenia, Romania. At the 2002 census, the town had a population of 12,886 people, making it Brăila County's second-largest urban locality.

History

The first mention of the town dates to 1834. It officially became a town in 1989, as a result of the Romanian rural systematization program.

Administration
The town's area is 186 km², of which 10.9 km² have the status of residential area. The town administers six villages: Berlești, Gara Ianca, Oprișenești, Perișoru, Plopu and Târlele Filiu. It also features a large military base scheduled to be transformed into a civil airport.

International relations

Ianca is twinned with La Chapelle-sur-Erdre, France since 2005.

Natives
 Virgil Huzum
 Ion Theodorescu-Sion

References

Populated places in Brăila County
Localities in Muntenia
Towns in Romania